Q Division may refer to:
 Q Division (James Bond)
 Q Division Records
 Q Division Studios
 the q-analog of regular division in Tsallis q-theory